James E. Smith (born November 15, 1948)  is the former mayor of Helena, Montana, the state's capital, having served in that position for 16 years, from 2002 until 2018. He was also the president of the Jedediah Smith Society from 2016 until 2019.  He is currently the vice-president.

References

1948 births
Living people
Mayors of places in Montana
Politicians from Helena, Montana
Carroll College (Montana) alumni
Montana State University alumni
21st-century American politicians
People from Anaconda, Montana